The 1946–47 İstanbul Football League season was the 39th season of the league. Fenerbahçe SK won the league for the 11th time.

Season

References

Istanbul Football League seasons
Turkey
2